The Alima River is a tributary of the Congo River. It is formed by the confluence of two streams, the Lékéti and the Dziélé.

Towns
Towns on the banks of this river include (from the source):
 Okoyo
 Boundji
 Oyo

Location

See also
List of rivers of the Republic of the Congo

References

Rivers of the Republic of the Congo
Tributaries of the Congo River